Enayatollah Reza (June 18, 1920 in Rasht – July 20, 2010 in Tehran) was an Iranian historian and professor of philosophy, a former member of the Iranian Communist Party, and a former Iranian military officer. He was a member of the Supreme Academic Council of the Centre for Iranian and Islamic Studies in Tehran, Iran, the publishers of the Encyclopaedia Islamica. His research concerned the historical regions of Iranian Azerbaijan and Caucasian Arran; based on this research, he claimed that "Azerbaijan" should properly refer only to the land south of the Aras River (in Iran) and that the country of Azerbaijan should instead be called "Aran".

Works
 The Sasanian Civilization (alternatively titled Civilization of Sassanid Iran, translation of book by Vladimir Grigorevich Lukonin)
 Azerbaijan va Arran (Albania-e Qafqaz) (in English: Azerbaijan and Aran (Albania of Caucasus))
 From Aran to Azerbaijan, Goftogu Quarterly 33, Spring 2002.

See also
Fazlollah Reza (brother)

References

People from Gilan Province
20th-century Iranian historians
1920 births
2010 deaths
People from Rasht
Tudeh Military Network members
Azerbaijani Democratic Party politicians
Imperial Iranian Air Force personnel
Iran's Book of the Year Awards recipients